Taqahai-ye Chahar Bisheh (also Romanized as Ţāqahāī-ye Chahār Bīsheh) is a village in Jastun Shah Rural District, Hati District, Lali County, Khuzestan Province, Iran. At the 2006 census, its population was 43, in 6 families.

References 

Populated places in Lali County